Fleuranges may refer to:

 Robert III de La Marck, son of the seigneur of Fleuranges
 Florange, Moselle, France, of which Fleuranges was a former name